Pemphredon lethifer  is a Palearctic species of solitary wasp. It prefers to make nests using large twigs from the genus Sambucus.

References

External links
Images representing Pemphredon lethifer

Hymenoptera of Europe
Crabronidae
Insects described in 1837
Palearctic insects